Nicholas Phillip Murcutt (5 June 1964 – 18 March 2011) was an Australian architect.

Career
Murcutt received his Architecture degree from the University of Sydney in 1989 and became a registered architect in 1990. He worked in several architectural firms including Terry Dorrough, Sydney 1984–1987 and after graduating Forward Consultants, Tasmania 1990–1991. In 1994 he then began work as an architectural tutor at the University of NSW, the University of Technology, Sydney, and the University of Sydney.

In 1994, Murcutt worked collaboratively with Neil Durbach and Camilla Block of Durbach Block Architects to form Durbach Block Murcutt, in which they received positive reviews for their amenities blocks for the Sydney Olympics.

In 2004, Murcutt along with his partner of 16 years Rachel Neeson began Neeson Murcutt Architects, also known as NMA; a combination of their individual practices. This practise is based in Sydney, Australia and most of their work is located in the state of New South Wales. In 2009, Murcutt and Neeson won the Wilkinson Award; an award for residential architecture presented by the Australian Institute of Architects, for the second time with the Whale Beach House.

Personal life
Nick Murcutt was born on 5 June 1964 in London, England. He is the son of Helen Murcutt and famous Australian architect Glenn Murcutt.

Murcutt died on 18 March 2011, aged 46, at his family home, after a nine-month battle with lung cancer.

Built works
Nick Murcutt
2000 Collopy House
1999 Box House
1998 Birrell House
1997 Amenities Block at Bethlehem Ladies College with Rachel Neeson Design
1997 Saady alteration and addition
1996 Cook Gymea House
1996 Coffey alteration and addition
1995 Lake Longueville House
1994 Young House

With Durbach Block
1998 Amenities buildings at Olympic Park

With Neeson and Murcutt Architects
2009 Zac's House
2009 Castlecrag House
2009 Woolwich House
2007 Whale Beach House
2007 North Avoca House
2006 The Beresford
2006 Five Dock House
2005 Pindimar House
2005 Birchgrove House addition and alteration
2002 Woollahra House addition and alteration

Awards and honours
Nick Murcutt
2000 Architecture Australia National Award for Open Residential with Collopy house

With Durbach Block
1997 RAIA Wilkinson Award for housing with Foster Street Penthouse apartments

With Neeson and Murcutt Architects
2009 Wilkinson Award for the Whale Beach House,
2009 National Architecture Award for Residential Architecture for Whale Beach House
2009 National Architecture Award for Residential Architecture for Zac's House
2009 RAIA VIC Chapter Architecture Award for Zac's House
2009 The Shipwreck Lookout exhibited at the Sunburnt Exhibition at RMIT
2008 RAIA NSW Chapter Architecture Award for the North Avoca House
2008 representation at the Venice Biennale
2007 Wilkinson Award for the Five Dock House
2007 Winner of Think Brick competition
2006 RAIA NSW Chapter commendation for the Shipwreck Lookout
2006 Shipwreck Lookout exhibited at the Venice Biennale
2005 Shipwreck Lookout exhibited at the AAA Young Architects Exhibition
2005 Table Bed Tent Exhibited at the Canberra Biennial
2014 The Sir John Sulman Award for Civic Architecture for Prince Alfred Park Pool and Park Upgrade

References

External links
 Official website
 Architecture and Urbanism March 2003
 Sydney Morning Herald Online Tributes
 Neeson Murcutt Architects
 Australian Institute of Architects
 Complete Home

1964 births
2011 deaths
Architects from Sydney